Joseph Phillips (24 March 1911 – 13 November 1987) was an Indian field hockey player who competed in the 1936 Summer Olympics. He was a member of the Indian field hockey team, which won the gold medal. He played one match as back.

Phillips was a Pune based hockey player. Joseph was born on March 24, 1911. Phillips was an Indian field hockey player who competed in the 1936 Summer Olympics at Berlin and won the gold medal. He played one match as back. India played 5 matches in the tournament and the team won all 5. The Indian national team scored a total of 38 goals. India beat United States (7-0), Japan (9-0) and Hungary (4-0). The Indian national hockey team that played in the 1936 Summer Olympics consisted of Dhyan Chand (captain), Ali Dara, Syed Mohammed Jaffar, Gurcharan Singh, Roop Singh, Mohammed Hussain, Mirza Nasir-ud-din Masud, Shabban Shahab-ud-din, Joseph Galibardy, Ahmed Sher Khan, Babu N. Nimal and Lionel C. Emmett, amongst others. In the finals against Germany, India had an advantage of 6 goals initially. The match was very challenging and exciting. Finally India won the match by beating Germany by 8-1.  That year, India won its third consecutive Olympic gold medal.

Joseph Phillips, along with Baboo Nimal, was amongst the two of the players from Pune who participated in the 1936 Indian Olympic team. Most of the residents of his local town appeared on the Khadki Railway Station to bid farewell to Phillips and Baburao, for the 1936 Olympic expedition. It was a huge honour for both Joseph Phillips and Baburao Narasappa Nimal. Joe Phillips died in 1986 at the age of 75.

References

External links
 

1911 births
1987 deaths
Field hockey players from Pune
Olympic field hockey players of India
Field hockey players at the 1936 Summer Olympics
Indian male field hockey players
Olympic gold medalists for India
Anglo-Indian people
Olympic medalists in field hockey
Medalists at the 1936 Summer Olympics